Heavy Reverie was released on May 27, 2014 by the American blues rock band Buffalo Killers.  This was the band's fifth studio release on Alive Naturalsound Records as a Compact Disc in addition to various colored vinyls in limited numbers.

Track listing
All songs composed and arranged by Andrew Gabbard and Zachary Gabbard.

 "Poisonberry Tide" – 3:01
 "Dig On In" – 2:22
 "This Girl Has Grown" – 3:42
 "Cousin Todd" – 2:30
 "Sandbox" – 3:17
 "Who You Are?" – 2:23
 "Grape Peel (How I Feel)*" – 3:48
 "Louder Than Your Lips*" – 3:02
 "Shake*" – 2:48
 "January" – 3:58

Personnel
Buffalo Killers
 Andrew Gabbard – guitar, vocals, piano
 Zachary Gabbard – bass guitar, vocals, guitar
 Joseph Sebaali – drums, piano, harpsichord
 Sven Kahns – guitar, vocals

Production
 Recorded & Mastered by Mike Montgomery at Candyland

References

2014 albums
Buffalo Killers albums